is a Japanese television drama series based on the detective novel series Bōkyaku Tantei by Nisio Isin. It premiered on NTV on October 10, 2015 on Saturdays at 21:00. It was directed by Tōya Satō who is known for Gokusen, 14-sai no Haha, and Kaseifu no Mita. Yui Aragaki played the lead role as the private detective, and Masaki Okada played the supporting role. It received the viewership rating of 10.5% on average.

Cast
Yui Aragaki as Kyouko Okitegami
Masaki Okada as Yakusuke Kakushidate
Daiki Arioka as Nuru Narikawa
Rio Uchida as Makuru Makuma
Mitsuhiko Oikawa as Horo Kizunai

Episodes

References

External links
 

Nisio Isin
Japanese drama television series
2015 in Japanese television
2015 Japanese television series debuts
2015 Japanese television series endings
Nippon TV dramas
Television shows based on Japanese novels